Ad Genius Lee Tae-baek is a 2013 South Korean television series starring Jin Goo, Park Ha-sun, Jo Hyun-jae and Han Chae-young. Set in the cutthroat field of advertising where creativity and competition coexist, the drama is the success story of underdog Lee Tae-baek who fights his way to becoming the best ad man in the business. It aired on KBS2 from February 4 to March 26, 2013, on Mondays and Tuesdays at 21:55 (KST) for 16 episodes.

The protagonist is loosely based on internationally-renowned advertising designer and social activist Jeseok Yi (a.k.a. Jeski), who wrote the 2010 book Ad Genius Lee Je-seok.

The drama reunites Han Chae-young and Jo Hyun-jae who previously worked together in the 2005 TV series Only You.

Synopsis 
Drama series depicts the lives and love of people working in the advertisement industry.

Lee Tae-baek (Jin Goo) is extremely talented but, due to his poor resume, goes through difficulties as he attempts to succeed in the advertising world.

Baek Ji-yoon (Park Ha-sun) is an intern at Geumsan Ad Company. She tries to do her best regardless of the task. Ji-yoon is full of passion and becomes involved with Lee Tae-Baek.

Go Ah-ri (Han Chae-young) is an ad planner at Geumsan Ad Company. She's a confident and sexy woman. In order to achieve her dream, she throws away her past and her love.

Cast

Main
Jin Goo as Lee Tae-baek
 Having come to Seoul from the countryside with nothing but a high school diploma and a gift for drawing, he starts out by handing out ads in the street and wearing sandwich boards. Through sheer hard work (the word "genius" in the title is meant ironically), he is determined to fulfill his dream of becoming the best ad man in the biz.
Park Ha-sun as Baek Ji-yoon
 A copywriter intern at an advertising firm. She hides her identity as the daughter of a chaebol to work her way up the ladder. Sincere and hardworking, her journey will parallel Tae-baek's as they fight for their jobs every step of the way.
Han Chae-young as Go Ah-ri / Bok-hee
Lee Sae-rom as young Go Ah-ri
 She is a glamorous, sophisticated, ambitious and pragmatic art director who sacrificed her past and her love to get to the top.
Jo Hyun-jae as Addie Kang
 A cool-headed ad executive, he comes back from the US to continue his family's ad agency dominance.

Supporting

People in GRC
Ko Chang-seok as Ma Jin-ga
 CEO of a tiny ad company. He becomes a key player in changing Lee Tae-baek's fate.
Kwak Hee-sung as Ma Yi-chan
 Son of Ma Jin-ga
Ah Young as Gong Sun-hye
Bang Dae-han as Hassan

People in Geumsan Ad Company
Choi Jung-woo as Kang Han-chul
 CEO of Geumsan Ad, an advertising agency affiliated with Geumsan Group
 as Lee Eun-hee
 Creative Director of Geumsan Ad Company whose current creative block has driven her to hysterics.
Shin Seung-hwan as Shin Dong-hoon
 Ad producer who has learned the art of covering up for his lack of skill with a glib tongue.
 as Kim Jong-wook
Yang Hee-yoon as Jang Min-ah
 as Executive Director Hwang

Lee Tae-baek's family
Han Sun-hwa as Lee So-ran
Tae-baek's younger sister
 as Ji Kwan-soon
Tae-baek's grandmother who took care of him and his sister in their parents' absence

Others
Yoo In-young as Han Byul
 as a jjajangmyeon restaurant owner
Jang Yong as Chairman Baek
Bang Eun-hee as Won Mi-ok
 Ji-yoon's hot-tempered aunt, who is devoted to her niece and ready to do anything for her if necessary.
 as President Nam
Lee Dae-yeon as President Choi

Ratings

References

External links
  
 Ad Genius Lee Tae-baek at KBS Global
 
 

Korean Broadcasting System television dramas
2013 South Korean television series debuts
2013 South Korean television series endings
Korean-language television shows
Television series by RaemongRaein